Sir Syed Government Girls College is located in Nazimabad at Karachi, Sindh, Pakistan. Sir Syed Girls College is adjacent to 1st Chowrangi, Altaf Ali Barelvi Road, Nazimabad, Karachi and is under the supervision of Government of Sindh.

History
Sir Syed Government Girls College is considered as one of the most premier educational institutions for girls in Karachi. The college was founded by Syed Altaf Ali Barelvi in 1954 solely to provide higher education to girls. The college has been named as Sir Syed Girls College after the leader Sir Syed Ahmed Khan. The present building of the college was completed in 1963. In September 1972, the college was nationalised and since then named as Sir Syed Government Girls College.

Principals
Mrs Naeem Shah

Mrs Zaman

Mrs Amna Kamal

Ms. Amina Siddiqi

See also
 Bushra Zaidi

References

External links
 Official website

Universities and colleges in Karachi
Women's universities and colleges in Pakistan